Hermsdorf may refer to the following places:

in Germany:
Hermsdorf, Brandenburg, in the Oberspreewald-Lausitz district, Brandenburg
Hermsdorf, Saxony-Anhalt, in the Börde district, Saxony-Anhalt
Hermsdorf, Saxony, in the Weißeritzkreis district, Saxony
Hermsdorf, Thuringia, in the Saale-Holzland district, Thuringia
Hermsdorf (Berlin), part of the borough Reinickendorf in Berlin
in Poland:
Hermsdorf, the German name for Jerzmanowa, Głogów County
Hermsdorf the German name for Sobięcin
Hermsdorf am Kynast, the German name for Sobieszów, part of Jelenia Góra
in the Czech Republic:
Hermsdorf, the German name for Heřmánky, a village in Nový Jičín District